Noell Coet (born in Carrollton, Texas) is an American actress. Up until her appearance in The Kings of Appletown, she worked as Noell Felmly.

Filmography

Film

Television

References

External links

Living people
21st-century American actresses
Actresses from Texas
American child actresses
American film actresses
American television actresses
People from Carrollton, Texas
Year of birth missing (living people)